David Golder is a 1931 French drama film directed by Julien Duvivier and starring Harry Baur, Paule Andral and . It is an adaptation of Irène Némirovsky's 1929 novel David Golder, about a self-made Jewish businessman.

Cast
Harry Baur as David Golder
Paule Andral as Gloria, his wife
 as Joyce, his daughter
Jean Bradin as Prince Alec, Joyce's fiancé
Gaston Jacquet as Count Hoyos
Jean Coquelin as Fischel
Camille Bert as Tübingen, Golder's Berlin business associate
Jacques Grétillat as Marcus, Golder's former associate
 as Soifer, Golder's friend
 as doctor
Charles Dorat as young emigrant
Nicole Yoghi as nurse

Bibliography

References

External links

Films directed by Julien Duvivier
French drama films
Films about businesspeople
Films based on French novels
French black-and-white films
1931 drama films
1930s French-language films
1930s French films